Anouk Ricard (born 28 December 1970) is a French comic book writer and illustrator.

Life
She then settled in Marseille where she produced animated films, worked for youth publishers and produced her first books. She returned to Strasbourg, where she began working on graphic novels. Her series Anna et Froga which she began in 2004 for Capsule Comique. Her work was selected three times for awards at the Angoulême International Comics Festival. She also produced Commissaire Toumi, aimed at an older market. This was followed by Patti et les fourmis in 2010 and Coucous Bouzon in 2011; these were both official selections of the International Comics Festival. In 2014, she was named by GQ France magazine as one of the 25 most humorous women in France. She currently lives in Lyon.

Ricard also produces paintings for comics festivals and sings and plays music under the pseudonym Frouky.

References

External links 
 

1970 births
Living people
French comics artists
French children's book illustrators
French children's writers
French women children's writers
French women illustrators
French illustrators
People from Istres